Lannick Gautry (born 3 March 1976) is a French actor.

Theater

Filmography

External links 
 

1976 births
Living people
People from Saint-Germain-en-Laye
French male film actors
French male stage actors
French male television actors
21st-century French male actors